"Dreadlock Holiday" is a reggae song by 10cc. Written by Eric Stewart and Graham Gouldman, it was the lead single from the band's 1978 album, Bloody Tourists.

Composition
The song was based on real events Eric Stewart and Moody Blues vocalist Justin Hayward experienced in Barbados; and Graham Gouldman experienced in Jamaica. Graham Gouldman commented: "Some of the experiences that are mentioned are true, and some of them are ... fairly true!" Stewart recalled seeing a white guy "trying to be cool and he looked so naff" walking into a group of Afro-Caribbeans and being reprimanded, which became the lyric "Don't you walk through my words, you got to show some respect." Another lyric came from a conversation Gouldman had with a Jamaican, who when asked if he liked cricket replied, "No, I love it!".

Music video
The music video for the song was directed by Storm Thorgerson. The beach scene in the official video was filmed on the Dorset coast near Charmouth.

Reception
"Dreadlock Holiday" became the group's international number 1 hit topping the charts in the UK, Belgium, New Zealand and The Netherlands. The single also reached number 2 in Ireland and Australia, became a top 10 hit in Norway and Switzerland, and top 20 in Germany and Sweden. In Austria the song became 10cc's single entry in the charts peaking at number 18.

In North America, "Dreadlock Holiday" became a minor hit, peaking at number 45 in Canada's RPM charts and number 44 on the US Billboard Hot 100. When asked why he thought the song didn't do better in the US, Gouldman said that reportedly some radio stations would not play reggae of any kind.

In the UK, the song was the band's third number 1 and at the same time final top 10 hit.

Cover versions
Boney M covered the song on their 1985 album Eye Dance.

Macka B English DJ covered the song.

Charts

Weekly charts

Year-end charts

Certifications

Usage in media
 In 2000, Guy Ritchie's movie Snatch contained the song.
 The song is used in the first episode of The Mighty Boosh, "Killeroo". It is danced to by Rich Fulcher's character, Bob Fossil.
 In 2002, Intenso Project sampled the track in their hit "Luv Da Sunshine".
 The song is known for its usage in the flash game The Skullkid.
 In 2010, David Fincher's movie The Social Network contained the song being mixed by a college DJ.
 The song has been used as the theme music for cricket programming in the UK on Sky Sports.
 The song appears in the 2016 video game Watch Dogs 2.
 The song has been used in " Shot on iPhone XS -- Our Game -- Apple " YouTube video by Apple India.
 The song was used in the 2019 Christmas Special of Gavin and Stacey.
 The song is used in the 2013 film Life of Crime starring Jennifer Aniston, Tim Robbins and Isla Fisher.

References

1978 songs
1978 singles
10cc songs
British reggae songs
Reggae rock songs
Songs written by Graham Gouldman
Songs written by Eric Stewart
Songs about Jamaica
Songs about reggae
Holiday songs
UK Singles Chart number-one singles
Number-one singles in New Zealand
Mercury Records singles